History of Joy is a Malayalam film directed by Vishnu Govindhan.The cast of the movie includes Vishnu Vinay, Vinay Forrt, Sai Kumar etc.

Cast 
 Vishnu Vinay
 Vinay Forrt
 Sai Kumar
 Leona Lishoy
 Joju George
 Nobi
 Nandu
 Sunil Sukhada

References

External links 

2010s Malayalam-language films
2017 films
Indian drama films